Pir Adil is a town and union council of Dera Ghazi Khan District in the Punjab province of Pakistan. It is located at 30°10'60N 70°43'60E and has an altitude of 119 metres (393 feet).

References

Populated places in Dera Ghazi Khan District
Union councils of Dera Ghazi Khan District
Cities and towns in Punjab, Pakistan